Biomech may refer to:
Biomechanics, the study of the mechanical function of biological systems
Biomechanical art, the style of H. R. Giger and tattoo
Ocean Machine: Biomech, a 1997 album by Canadian musician Devin Townsend